The elongate mbuna (Pseudotropheus elongatus) is a species of cichlid endemic to Lake Malawi where it is known from Mkata Bay and Mbamba Bay.  It prefers areas with rocky substrates where it can graze on algae.  It can reach a length of  SL.  It can also be found in the aquarium trade.

References

elongate mbuna
elongate mbuna
Freshwater fish of Tanzania
Taxa named by Geoffrey Fryer
elongate mbuna
Taxonomy articles created by Polbot
Taxobox binomials not recognized by IUCN